José Angel García Sánchez (born February 23, 1981) is a Cuban professional baseball pitcher for Cazadores de Artemisa in the Cuban National Series.

García played for the Cuba national baseball team at the 2017 World Baseball Classic.

References

External links

1981 births
Living people
Cuban baseball players
Baseball pitchers
Vaqueros de la Habana players
Cazadores de Artemisa players
Toronjeros de Isla de la Juventud players
Sabuesos de Holquin players
Tigres de Ciego de Avila players
2017 World Baseball Classic players
People from Artemisa